Raghda Gamal is a Yemeni journalist and poet.

Biography 
Gamal began working as a journalist in 2008, writing for both Arabic and English language Yemeni newspapers. Gamal also writes poetry about her experiences during the 2011 political uprising in Yemen. She has had two collections of poetry translated into English. The first collection was the first Yemeni collection of poems translated into English.

Publications 

 Gamal, R. (2012). Once Upon a Revolution: Poems and Photos.

References

Living people
Yemeni poets
Yemeni journalists
Year of birth missing (living people)